Lions Rump is a conspicuous headland  north-northeast of Low Head, forming the west side of the entrance to King George Bay, on King George Island, in the South Shetland Islands of Antarctica. It was charted and given its descriptive name in 1937 by Discovery Investigations personnel on the Discovery II. Chopin Ridge runs between Lions Rump and Low Head.

Important Bird Area
The headland has been identified as an Important Bird Area (IBA) by BirdLife International because it supports a large breeding colony of Adélie penguins, with about 12,000 pairs recorded in 1980.  Other birds nesting at the site in smaller numbers include gentoo and chinstrap penguins, southern giant petrels, Cape petrels, Wilson's and black-bellied storm petrels, snowy sheathbills, south polar and brown skuas, kelp gulls and Antarctic terns.  Southern elephant seals, Antarctic fur seals and Weddell seals breed on the beaches.  The boundary of the  IBA is defined by the boundary of ASPA 151, designated for the protection of the ecological values of the area, including the lichens, vascular plants and birds, and of representative examples of maritime Antarctic habitats.

References

Headlands of King George Island (South Shetland Islands)
Important Bird Areas of Antarctica
Seabird colonies
Antarctic Specially Protected Areas
Penguin colonies